Pseudovomer minutus is an extinct species of prehistoric, Miocene carangid similar to the modern-day lookdown, Selene vomer, that lived during the Messinian subepoch of what is now Sicily.

See also

 Prehistoric fish
 List of prehistoric bony fish

References

Miocene fishes of Europe
Carangidae
Neogene fish of Europe
Fossil taxa described in 1870